Acropoliis Entertainment is an Indian Bengali-language television serial and film production company based in Kolkata, incorporated on 6 October 2006. Acropoliis Entertainment Private Limited has 4 creative directors/key management personnel- Snigdha Sumit Basu, Sumit Tinkari Basu, Rajnish Jaichandra Hedao and Sani Ghose Ray. They started off with shows like "Agnipariksha" and "Rashi",  and went on to produce many more popular shows on Bengali Television, the most notable ones being- Bodhuboron, Raaikishori, Milon Tithi, Aamar Durga, Bokul Kotha, Irabotir Chupkotha, Sanjher Baati, Mon Phagun, and Gaatchora.

Current TV shows

Film productions 
Cross Connection (2009)
Nagarkirtan (2019)

Web series

TV series productions

References

Companies based in Kolkata
Television production companies of India
Entertainment companies of India
Entertainment companies established in 2006
2006 establishments in West Bengal
Indian companies established in 2006